Tales of Zorro is a 2008 anthology of Zorro stories and is the first collection of original short fiction featuring pulp hero Zorro. It was edited by Richard Dean Starr and published by Moonstone Books.  A second anthology, More Tales of Zorro, was published in 2011.

Book notes

The stories in Tales of Zorro incorporate elements from the original Zorro character created by Johnston McCulley in The Curse of Capistrano (1919). These stories also refer to other references to the mythical Zorro, including Walt Disney's 1957 series Zorro (starring Guy Williams), the New World Television series (1990), the 1998 film The Mask of Zorro, and Chilean author Isabel Allende's Zorro: A Novel (2005), among others.

Some stories, such as Peter David's "Colors Seen by Candlelight", incorporate known historical figures into the story. Others contain suggestions of the supernatural or are told from unconventional viewpoints, such as A. C. Crispin and Kathleen O'Malley's story, "Tornado Warning". This is told through the eyes of Zorro's Andalusian stallion, Tornado.

The collection includes a young adult story, "The Feathered Cape" by Jan Adkins, author of Young Zorro: The Iron Brand.  Adkins is a young adult author and illustrator who was a technical advisor for Allende's 2005 Zorro.

Richard Dean Starr contributed the story, "Winds of Change", and collaborated with Max Allan Collins on  "Zorro and the Fate Worse Than Death".

Tales of Zorro contains three substantive essays, including an introduction by Guy Williams, Jr. (with Matthew Baugh); a foreword by Zorro Productions, Inc. Senior Vice-President Sandra Curtis; and an Afterword by Isabel Allende.

Contributors, in order of appearance

Guy Williams, Jr. with Matthew Baugh: Introduction
Sandra Curtis: Forward
Jeff Mariotte: "Mission Gold"
Robin Wayne Bailey: "The Return of Don Ramon"
Robert Greenberger: "Flood of Tears"
Peter David: "Colors Seen by Candlelight"
Greg Cox: "The Weeping Woman"
Nancy Holder: "Zorro in the Valley of the Shadow"
Tim Lasiuta and CJ Henderson: "The Fox and the Tiger"
Elizabeth Massie: "Corazon de Oro"
Richard Dean Starr: "Winds of Change"
Jan Adkins: "The Feathered Cape"
Mike Bullock and Matthew Baugh: "Enemy of My Enemy"
Jean Schanberger: "More Than Meets Z Eye"
Andy Mangels and Michael A. Martin: "Stolen Heart"
A. C. Crispin and Kathleen O'Malley: "Tornado Warning"
Loren D. Estleman: "El Pajaro"
Edward Gorman, Robert Morrish and Terence Butler: "The False Face"
Max Allan Collins: "Zorro and the Fate Worse Than Death"
Isabel Allende: Afterword

Artists and illustrators

Cover Art (trade edition): Douglas Klauba
Cover Art (limited edition): Sergio Martinez
Interior Illustrations: Ruben Procopio

Book design

Cover Concept and Art Direction: Richard Dean Starr
Cover Design: Jim Alexander, Jim Harrington
Graphic Design and Prepress: Erik Enervold/Simian Brothers Creative

See also
Californio
Category: Native American history of California
Ranchos of California—List of Ranchos of California
Category: Mexican California (1823—1846)

2008 anthologies
Fiction anthologies
Books about Native Americans
Californios
Short stories set in California
Zorro